The River Quanery is a river in Dominica. It rises on the northern slopes of Morne Trois Pitons, flowing northeast to reach the Atlantic Ocean on the country's central eastern coast, close to the town of Castle Bruce.

Quanery